Yatee Zapotec and Lachirioag Zapotec  (San Cristóbal Lachiruaj) are dialects of a Zapotec language of Oaxaca, Mexico.

The Mexican government organization INALI recognizes both Yalálag Zapotec and Yatee Zapotec as a variety of Zapotec called Zapoteco serrano, del sureste.

References

Zapotec languages